Corporation$ is an EP by British death metal band Cancer, released after the band reunited in 2004.

Track listing
  "Oil"   – 4:19  
  "Witch Hunt (Hardcore live in the studio 2003)"  – 2:33  
  "Dethroned Emperor (Nasty Nasty live in the studio)"  – 4:51  
  "Oxygen Thieves (Don't Breathe My Air Mix)"  – 4:01  
  "Oil (Severed Satchel Hairy Scary Mix)"  – 5:29

Cancer (band) albums
2004 albums